Winchester Dialogues refers to two works of Early English Drama found in Winchester College MS 33, first published by Norman Davis in 1979. Occupation and Idleness is a mid-fifteenth century interlude or play, although it is referred to as a "dialogue". Lucidus and Dubius is better described as a semi-dramatic dialogue rather than a play.

Lucidus and Dubius 
The following two stanzas (Lines 440 - 449) serve to provide a general description of Lucidus and Dubius.
 LUCIDUS: A, douteful Dubius, doubtful Dubius! 
 The cause there-of is this.
 The first maide that ever was
 was Eve, Adamys wyf.
 Sche wrou3t the first trespas
 and made al oure wo and stryf;
 and as thurgh a mayde deth come in
 and al men were lore,
 Crist so wolde be Mary Virgyn
 alle the world restore.

Modern English translation 
 LUCIDUS: Ah, doubtful Dubius, doubtful Dubius! 
 The cause of that is this.
 The first virgin that ever lived
 was Eve, Adam's wife.
 She initiated the first trespass 
 And caused all our anguish and strife
 and because of this virgin death will occur
 and all men were taught,
 so by the Virgin Mary Christ would
 cleanse the entire world.

Occupation and Idleness 
The following two stanzas (Lines 430 - 438) serve to provide a general description of Occupation and Idleness.
 OCCUPACION: Ydelnes is nat ferre, as thynkith me, 
 And so Y tolde one ryght now.
 DOCTRINE: Ydelnes, where is he?
 OCCUPACION: Yonder, syr, as ye may se,
 And scorneth both me and yow.
 DOCTRINE: Ydelnes, come nere 
 And lerne of me som curtesie.
 YDELNES: Y shrew me and Y come ther
 While thou art so angry.

Modern English translation 
 OCCUPACION: It seems to me that Idleness is not far [away]
 And so I told you right now.
 DOCTRINE: Idleness, where is he?
 OCCUPACION: Over there, sir, as you will see,
 And scorns both you and I.
 DOCTRINE: Idleness, come here
 And learn some courtesy from me
 YDELNES: I curse myself if I [will] come to you
 While you are so angry.

References

15th-century books